Mohammad Bagher Ghalibaf or Mohammad Baqer Qalibaf (born 23 August 1961) is an Iranian conservative politician, former military officer, and current Speaker of the Parliament of Iran since 2020. He held office as the Mayor of Tehran from 2005 to 2017. Ghalibaf was formerly Iran's Chief of police from 2000 to 2005 and commander of the Revolutionary Guards' Air Force from 1997 to 2000.

He holds a Ph.D. in political geography from Tarbiat Modares University. He is also a pilot, certified to fly certain Airbus aircraft. He began his military career during the Iran–Iraq War in 1980. He became chief commander of the Imam Reza Brigade in 1982 and was chief commander of Nasr Division from 1983 to 1984. After the end of the war, he became Managing-Director of Khatam al-Anbia, an engineering firm controlled by the Islamic Revolutionary Guard Corps and was appointed as commander of the IRGC Air Force in 1996 by Ali Khamenei. Four years later, he became chief of the Iranian Police Forces after the previous commander was dismissed following the 1999 student protests. He was also appointed as Representative of President Mohammad Khatami during a campaign to combat smuggling in 2002. In September 2005, he was elected as Tehran's mayor by the City Council of Tehran. He is also a professor at the University of Tehran.

Ghalibaf is often regarded a perennial candidate in the presidential elections. He was a candidate in the 2013 presidential election but lost to Hassan Rouhani, in second place with 6,077,292 of the votes. He was also a candidate in the 2005 presidential election. He announced his run for a third time in the 2017 election. However, he withdrew on 15 May 2017 in favor of Ebrahim Raisi's candidacy.

In the 2020 Iranian legislative election, the Principlists regained the majority in the legislature, and Ghalibaf was elected as the new Speaker of Iran Parliament.

Personal life 
Ghalibaf was born on 23 August 1961 in Torqabeh, near Mashhad, in the diverse province of Razavi Khorasan to a Persian mother Kheirolnessa Boujmehrani and an ethnic Kurdish father Hossein Ghalibaf.

Ghalibaf married Zahra Sadat Moshir in 1982 when he was twenty two years old. Moshir (born 1968) joined her husband as an adviser and head of women's affairs in the Municipality of Tehran.

Education 
Ghalibaf obtained bachelor in human geography from Tehran University, master in human geography from Islamic Azad University and PhD in political geography from Tarbiat Modares University.

Military career

At the age of 19, he was one of the commanders of the defense forces during the Iran–Iraq War. Shortly afterwards he was named commander of the Rasulollah division. By the time he was twenty-two, he was already commander of the Nasr Troops. After the war he was selected as Deputy Commander of the Resistance Force and Basij Troops under General Afshar. Ghalibaf received the degree of Major General in 1996 after he had completed a master's degree in geopolitics. In 1998, when Mohsen Rezaei retired and Yahya Rahim Safavi took over as IRGC's new commander-in-chief, he was named Commander of Aerospace Force of the Islamic Revolutionary Guard Corps.

Ghalibaf became one of the senior commanders of the Islamic Revolutionary Guard Corps (IRGC) in later years. In 1984, he was appointed head of the Khatam al-Anbia Construction Headquarters, which is the engineering arm of the IRGC. Under his management, the headquarters launched a 165-kilometer railway connecting Mashhad to Sarakhs.

As commander of the Revolutionary Guards Air Force during the 1999 student protests, Ghalibaf was one of the 24 IRGC commanders who sent a threatening letter to the reformist president Mohammad Khatami stating that if the protests were allowed to continue, they would take matters into their own hands.

Police career

Following the 1999 protests, he was appointed as chief of the Iranian Police Forces by the Supreme Leader of Iran, Ali Khamenei, to succeed General Hedayat Lotfian who was removed from his office during the violence. After becoming chief of police, Ghalibaf initiated some reforms in the forces, including dropping all lawsuits against newspapers, modernization of police equipment and the Police 110 project, which aimed to make the police more accessible to the general public.

On 5 April 2005, Ghalibaf submitted his resignation from the military positions (including the police forces) due to his intention to run for the presidency of Iran.

Mayor of Tehran

When Ghalibaf lost the 2005 election, he was proposed as Mayor of Tehran along with Mohammad Aliabadi and Mohammad-Ali Najafi. On 4 September 2005, he was elected as the next Mayor by the City Council of Tehran to succeed Mahmoud Ahmadinejad who left the office after being elected president. He received 8 out of 15 votes of the council. He was reelected for a second term on 2007 after receiving 12 votes with no opponent.

According to Bloomberg, he has used his position as mayor "to foster a reputation as a politician who gets things done." Ghalibaf seek for reelection as Mayor of Tehran as the Conservative's choice in the 2013 local elections. His rivals were Mohsen Hashemi Rafsanjani, Masoumeh Ebtekar, Ali Nikzad and Mohsen Mehralizadeh. He was elected as Mayor for another term on 8 September 2013 after defeating Hashemi in a runoff with 51.6% of the votes.

Presidential campaigns

2005 presidential election
Ghalibaf was a candidate in the Iranian presidential election of 2005, and was being considered to be supported by some factions of the conservative alliance because of his popularity with both wings. However, in the final days before the election, the major support went to Mahmoud Ahmadinejad. Ghalibaf came fourth in the election. He made a populist appeal during the campaigns.

On 13 October 2008, he announced his support for dialogue with the United States as suggested by President (then presidential candidate) Barack Obama. According to Ghalibaf, "the world community, the Iranian society and the US society would benefit" from such talks.

2013 presidential election
Ghalibaf did not run for presidency in the elections in 2009. His adviser announced that he would take part in the presidential elections in June 2013 and he officially announced this on 16 July 2012. In his speech during the announcement of his candidacy, he said:

“That's two things I still stand on and would seriously consider, first: the Constitution and second: respect the prisoners and detainees."

He also set Love and Sacrifice and Jihadi Change as his official slogans. His candidacy was approved by the Guardian Council on 21 May 2013 along with seven other candidates. He was one of the opponents of Ali Akbar Hashemi Rafsanjani's candidacy and says it was better that Rafsanjani not enter the race, as he had served two terms before. He and two other candidates, Ali Akbar Velayati and Gholam-Ali Haddad-Adel, formed a coalition called "2+1". He was endorsed by former candidates, Alireza Ali Ahmadi and Sadeq Vaeez Zadeh. Ali Larijani, the current chairman of parliament, also supported Ghalibaf in the election.

According to the Guardian, his moderating streak as Tehran's mayor is evident throughout Ghalibaf's political efforts. Ghalibaf received 6,077,292 votes (16.55%), putting him in second place behind winner Hassan Rouhani, who was elected as the new president. Hours after the announcement of the results, Ghalibaf published a statement congratulating Hassan Rouhani on his election as President of Iran and conceding.

2017 presidential election

Electoral history

Party affiliation
Ghalibaf is regarded the spiritual leader behind Progress and Justice Population of Islamic Iran and Iranian Islamic Freedom Party. He is a member of the political alliance Popular Front of Islamic Revolution Forces.

Controversies and scandals

Allegations of corruption

Yas Holding Company case 
Ghalibaf has been accused of using his influence as a former IRGC commander to cover up corruption scandals that took place in Tehran during his term as mayor. One such scandal, which took place in 2017, involved the Yas Holding Company, a company whose board is partially made up of IRGC generals. The company was accused of embezzling an estimated 13 trillion tomans (US$3 billion) from Tehran Municipality for overpriced infrastructure projects built by construction companies linked to the IRGC during Ghalibaf's mayorship. In early 2022, a leaked audio recording was published by Radio Farda, which purported to show former IRGC Major General Mohammad Ali Jafari and Brigadier General Sadegh Zolghadr-Nia discussing the Yas Holding Company case, mentioning Ghalibaf's efforts to cover up the scandal by using his connections to the IRGC, by enlisting the support of Hossein Taeb, the head of the IRGC's Intelligence Organization.

"LayetteGate" and luxury apartments in Istanbul 
In April 2022, photos were published on Twitter that showed Ghalibaf's wife, Zahra Sadat Moshirand, and members of Ghalibaf's family at Tehran Imam Khomeini International Airport, returning from a luxury shopping trip in Turkey with 20 pieces of luggage, which were said to be a layette for their newborn child. The scandal, dubbed LayetteGate or SismuniGate by Iranian Twitter users, led to calls for him to step down as speaker of Parliament, with critics accusing Ghalibaf of being out of touch for his family shopping overseas during an economic crisis, and hypocrisy, pointing to comments made during his 2017 presidential campaign, where he criticized a former minister for traveling to Italy to purchase baby clothes. The criticism of Ghalibaf's family escalated when further allegations were made by an Iranian journalist based in Turkey that Ghalibaf's wife, daughter and son-in-law had purchased two luxury apartments in Istanbul worth 400 billion rials (US$1.6 million).

Accolades
 World Mayor: 8th place (2008)
 Sustainable Transport Award: 2nd place (2011)

References

External links

 
 
 
 
Mohammad Bagher Ghalibad on Ponishare 

1961 births
Living people
Tarbiat Modares University alumni
People from Mashhad
Islamic Revolutionary Guard Corps brigadier generals
Mayors of Tehran
Candidates for President of Iran
Islamic Revolutionary Guard Corps personnel of the Iran–Iraq War
Iranian people of Kurdish descent
Iranian Kurdish politicians
Progress and Justice Population of Islamic Iran politicians
Iranian news website owners (people)
Populism in Iran
Spiritual leaders of political parties in Iran
Popular Front of Islamic Revolution Forces politicians
Chief commanders of Law Enforcement Force of Islamic Republic of Iran
Speakers of the Islamic Consultative Assembly